Trinh thử ("The Virgin Mouse") by Hò̂ Huyè̂n Qui is a 15th-century Vietnamese Nôm poem in 850 lines in lục bát verse.

References

Vietnamese poems